Belgorod is a city in Russia.

Belgorod or Bilhorod may also refer to:

 Russian submarine Belgorod (K-329)
 Bilhorod-Dnistrovskyi, a city in Ukraine
 Belgorod Kievsky, a defunct city in Kievan Rus
 9612 Belgorod, a minor planet

See also
 Belgrade
 White City (disambiguation)